The Weingreen Museum of Biblical Antiquities is located in the Arts and Social Sciences Building, in Trinity College, Dublin. It received its present title in 1977 in recognition of Professor Jacob Weingreen's contribution to the creation of the museum. Professor Weingreen was Erasmus Smith's Professor of Hebrew at Trinity College Dublin between 1939 and 1979.

The museum consists mainly of pottery and other artefacts from the Ancient Near East. The nucleus of the museum's collection is constituted by artifacts from the excavations of four Biblical cities in Israel: Lachish (Director: J.L. Starkey, 1932–1938), Jericho (Kathleen Kenyon 1952–1959), Jerusalem (Kathleen Kenyon, 1961–1967) and Buseirah in Jordan (Crystal Bennett, 1971–1975). It holds over 2000 objects. It is curated by Zuleika Rodgers, and is available to view by appointment only, though it is being digitised for online viewing.

References

External links
 

1977 establishments in Ireland
Archaeological museums in the Republic of Ireland
Archaeology of the Near East
Buildings and structures of Trinity College Dublin
Museums established in 1977
Museums in Dublin (city)
University museums in the Republic of Ireland